Leopoldine Kovarik (5 February 1919 – 2 November 1943) was a post office employee who lived and worked in a suburb on the south side of Vienna.   After Austria was merged into Nazi Germany she became a resistance activist.   During the Second World War she became a member of a group which used to write letters to members of the army encouraging them to desert.   Aged 24, she was convicted under the usual charge of "preparing to commit high treason" ("Vorbereitung zum Hochverrat") and guillotined at Vienna's regional penitentiary, which had incorporated its own execution chamber since the aftermath of the short-lived uprising of 1934.

Life 
Leopoldine "Poldi" Kovarik was born in Vienna. After Austria's multi-party democratic system had been superseded by the so-called "Ständestaat" in 1934 she switched to the  Young Communists.

During the  Austrofascist period, between 1934 and 1938, Kovarik was twice arrested on account of her political activities.   By 1938 she was aged 19, and employed as a post office official, assigned to work for the  post office savings bank ("Postparkasse").   1938 was the year of the "Anschluss".   Many welcomed the incorporation of Austria into Nazi Germany, but those on the political left did not.   She joined a  Soldiers' Council ("Soldatenrat")  Young Communist group led by  Alfred Rabofsky.   During the war the "Soldatenrat" specialised in writing and sending letters to members of the army, calling upon them to desert.    Other members of the group alongside Kovarik were Anna Gräf and Elfriede Hartmann who were both, like Rabofsky himself, executed before 1945.   In her apartment in  Vienna-Favoriten she organised the paper work for the "soldier work".   She was in addition responsible for communications with resistance group members in Graz, in  the south of the country.

Leopoldine Kovarik was also a supporter of the leading  Austrian communist,  Leo Gabler (1908-1944) who had returned from Moscow via Yugoslavia in 1941 in order the rebuild the destroyed party with a new leadership team.   (As a result of the Molotov-Ribbentrop Pact of 1939, exiled Austrian communists leaders, including  KPÖ founder member Franz Koritschoner, had previously been deported from the Soviet Union where they had taken refuge and handed over to the Nazis.)

Trial and death 

On 13 November 1941, while visiting Berlin, Leopoldine Kovarik was arrested.   There was evidently no sense of urgency about bringing her to trial, but on 27 September 1943 she faced the special "People's Court" and found guilty of "preparing to commit high treason" ("Vorbereitung zum Hochverrat").   Above all the court found that she had been engaged in "production and distribution of treasonable letters intended for despatch to members of the army".   The court also found that she had often met with [the Commuinst leader, Leo Gabler] and had learned from him of plans to rebuild the Austrian Communist Party in Vienna.   After that she had acted as a contact between Gabler and other "Communist officials" or like-minded comrades such as [Friedrich] Hedrich and [Ernst] Rousek.   She herself had also participated in meeting with Gabler and these other "co-communists" in connection with the political situation and their "illegal work".

Her death sentence was carried out on 2 November 1943. using the guillotine that had been installed some years earlier at Vienna's regional penitentiary.

References 

Austrian resistance members
Austrian people executed by Nazi Germany
Politicians from Vienna
1919 births
1943 deaths